Borey may refer to:

People
 Khim Borey (born 1989), Cambodian football player
 Noun Borey (born 1996), Cambodian football player

Places
 Borey, Haute-Saône, Bourgogne-Franche-Comté, France
 Mongkol Borey (town), Cambodia

Other
 Borey or Borei-class submarine (Russian: Борей)